

Gmina Świdwin is a rural gmina (administrative district) in Świdwin County, West Pomeranian Voivodeship, in north-western Poland. Its seat is the town of Świdwin, although the town is not part of the territory of the gmina.

Villages
Gmina Świdwin contains the villages and settlements of Bedlno, Bełtno, Berkanowo, Bierzwnica, Blizno, Buczyna, Bystrzyna, Bystrzynka, Cieszeniewo, Cieszyno, Czarnolesie, Dobrowola, Głuszkowo, Gola Dolna, Gola Górna, Karpno, Kartlewo, Kawczyno, Klępczewo, Kleśnica, Kłośniki, Kluczkówko, Kluczkowo, Kowanowo, Krasna, Krosino, Kunowo, Łąkowo, Lekowo, Lipce, Miłobrzegi, Niemierzyno, Nowy Przybysław, Oparzno, Osowo, Półchleb, Przybyradz, Przymiarki, Psary, Rogalinko, Rogalino, Rusinowo, Rycerzewko, Sława, Śliwno, Smardzko, Stary Przybysław, Świdwinek and Ząbrowo.

Neighbouring gminas
Gmina Świdwin is bordered by the town of Świdwin and by the gminas of Brzeżno, Łobez, Ostrowice, Połczyn-Zdrój, Rąbino, Resko and Sławoborze.

References
Polish official population figures 2006

Swidwin
Gmina Swidwin